Luigi Tarantino (born 10 November 1972) is an Italian fencer and Olympic medalist in the sabre competition. He was the 1998 World Champion for men's sabre.

Biography

Achievements
Fencing World Cup
  Sabre (1998, 2008)

References

External links

1972 births
Living people
Fencers from Naples
Italian male sabre fencers
Olympic fencers of Italy
Fencers at the 1996 Summer Olympics
Fencers at the 2000 Summer Olympics
Fencers at the 2004 Summer Olympics
Fencers at the 2008 Summer Olympics
Fencers at the 2012 Summer Olympics
Olympic silver medalists for Italy
Olympic bronze medalists for Italy
Olympic medalists in fencing
Medalists at the 1996 Summer Olympics
Medalists at the 2004 Summer Olympics
Medalists at the 2008 Summer Olympics
Medalists at the 2012 Summer Olympics
Fencers of Centro Sportivo Carabinieri
Mediterranean Games silver medalists for Italy
Competitors at the 2005 Mediterranean Games
Universiade medalists in fencing
Mediterranean Games medalists in fencing
Universiade silver medalists for Italy
Medalists at the 1997 Summer Universiade